Roy Robert Partee (September 7, 1917 – December 27, 2000) was a Major League Baseball catcher. He is likely best remembered as the man behind the plate for Enos Slaughter's "mad dash" in game seven of the  World Series and as the New York Mets scout responsible for signing Bud Harrelson, Tug McGraw, Rick Aguilera and Greg Jeffries, among others.

Path to the majors
Partee was born in Los Angeles to father Clair C. Partee and mother Eutha Wyche. He was an Arizona–Texas League All-Star in  when he batted .365 with nine home runs for the Bisbee Bees. His performance got him signed with the Chicago Cubs' St. Joseph Angels the following season, however, after batting .245 with five home runs, he was let go.

He batted .299 and committed only four errors behind the plate in 560 chances. After the season, his contract was purchased by the Boston Red Sox.

Boston Red Sox

1943–1944
In  he started 76 games as catcher and was called up by the U.S. Military in June, but was rejected due to a bad ankle. He returned to the Red Sox, and in his first game back he clubbed his first major league home run, a walk-off to defeat Atley Donald and the New York Yankees, 8-7. He finished the season with a .243 batting average, and then enlisted at Fort MacArthur in California on October 19, 1944 thus missing the  season due to his military service during World War II.

1946 Season
That year, the Red Sox ran away with the American League crown by twelve games over the Detroit Tigers with a 104–50 record, and were heavy favorites in the World Series against the St. Louis Cardinals, however the series went the full seven games.

In game seven, Partee was involved in a famous play known as the "mad dash". The Red Sox had tied the score at 3–3 in the top half of the eighth inning, and Partee entered the game as catcher, replacing Rip Russell who had pinch hit for starting catcher Hal Wagner. Enos Slaughter led off the bottom half of the inning with a single. After the next two batters failed to advance him, Slaughter found himself still on first base with two outs. With outfielder Harry Walker at the plate with a two balls and one strike count, the Cardinals called for a hit and run. With Slaughter running, Walker lined the ball to left-center field. Leon Culberson fielded the ball, and threw a relay to shortstop Johnny Pesky. Slaughter rounded third base heading for home, running through the stop sign from his third base coach. What exactly happened when Pesky turned around is still a matter of contention, but Partee caught a delayed throw up the line, allowing Slaughter to score what proved to be the winning run.

In the top of the ninth inning, Partee batted for the Red Sox with men on first and third with one out; however he fouled out to first baseman Stan Musial for the second out of the inning, and the next batter, Tom McBride, grounded out to give the Cardinals the championship.  Partee finished the series batting one-for-ten with one RBI and one walk; it was the only postseason series of his career.

1947 Season
In , Partee's final year with Boston, he platooned with Birdie Tebbetts behind the plate.  Partee started 45 games as catcher, and his hitting declined to a .231 average for the season.

St. Louis Browns
In November 1947 Partee was part of a blockbuster trade as he, Pete Layden, Eddie Pellagrini, Al Widmar and Jim Wilson, plus two players to be named later and an undisclosed amount of cash (eventually, only one player, Joe Ostrowski, and $310,000) were sent to the St. Louis Browns for Jack Kramer and Vern Stephens. For the  season Partee batted just .203 with seventeen RBIs platooning with Les Moss in his only year with the Browns. In December 1948, Partee was part of a second blockbuster deal, as he and Fred Sanford were sent to the New York Yankees for Red Embree, Sherm Lollar, Dick Starr and $100,000.

Return to the minors
Partee never made a major league appearance with the Yankees. In , he became player/manager of the California League's Stockton Ports, and led his club to a 94-53 record. In his three seasons at the helm, Stockton went 238-189, and he actually pitched in a couple of games. In , he managed the Eugene Emeralds. Though he was retired as a player, he inserted himself into the line-up for one game, and went two-for-three.

Career stats

He was considered one of the better fielding catchers of his era, however, he had little power, clubbing only two home runs in his five-year major league career. In 1234 minor league games, he batted .268 with 36 home runs. He batted and threw right-handed.

Post-playing career
Partee died in Eureka, California, at the age of 83.

References

External links

SABR Baseball Biography Project

1917 births
2000 deaths
Baseball players from Los Angeles
Bisbee Bees players
Boston Red Sox players
Edmonton Eskimos (baseball) players
Eugene Emeralds managers
Eugene Emeralds players
Kansas City Blues (baseball) players
Major League Baseball catchers
New York Mets scouts
Portsmouth Cubs players
St. Joseph Angels players
St. Louis Browns players
Salt Lake City Bees players
San Francisco Seals (baseball) players
Stockton Ports players
Syracuse Chiefs players